Sub-Tenon injection is an ocular route of drug administration. It involves administration of a medication to the area between the sclera and the Tenon capsule.

Posterior sub-Tenons steroid injections (PSTSI) is used in the treatment of posterior ocular inflammation, such as chronic uveitis. This route is also reported to be used to administer triamcinolone acetonide (a corticosteroid) in the treatment of macular telangiectasia type 1.

Also, it is used in the ocular anesthesia.

References

Ophthalmic drug administration